The Gordon Nunataks are a group of nunataks on the south side of Mosby Glacier, near its head, in south-central Palmer Land, Antarctica. They were mapped by the U.S. Geological Survey from aerial photographs taken by the U.S. Navy, 1966–69. In association with the names of Antarctic oceanographers grouped in this area, they were named in 1977 by the UK Antarctic Place-names Committee after Arnold L. Gordon, an American oceanographer who is Professor of Geology at the Lamont–Doherty Geological Observatory, Columbia University, New York.

References

Nunataks of Palmer Land